Yellow woodsorrel may refer to any member of the woodsorrel genus (Oxalis) with yellow flowers (also called "yellow-sorrels"), but especially:

 Oxalis corniculata (creeping woodsorrel), a low-lying species
 Oxalis dillenii (southern yellow woodsorrel), an erect species with hairy fruits
 Oxalis grandis (large yellow woodsorrel)
 Oxalis stricta (common yellow woodsorrel), an erect species with nude fruits
Oxalis suksdorfii (western yellow woodsorrel)